Emanuel Joseph Lee (died 1941) was a philatelist who was a specialist in the stamps of Uruguay.

Philately
Lee specialised in the stamps of Uruguay. In 1933, he was awarded the Crawford Medal by the Royal Philatelic Society London for his work The postage stamps of Uruguay. Lee was such an enthusiastic collector of Uruguay that he was once called "the man who killed Uruguay" because during his philatelic career he acquired virtually everything important from Uruguay that came on the market. His Grand-Prix winning Uruguay collection was sold by Plumridge & Co., London, in 1936.

Selected publications
The postage stamps of Uruguay. London: M. Harvey, 1931.

See also
 Ferrer corner block of 15 of the 80 centésimos green 1856 'Diligencia'

References

Further reading
Uruguay, The Grand Prix Collection Formed by Mr. E.J. Lee. London: Plumridge & Co., 1936.

1941 deaths
Philatelists
Philately of Uruguay
Year of birth missing
Philatelic literature